Wercklea cocleana is a species of plant in the family Malvaceae. It is endemic to Panama. It is threatened by habitat loss.

References

cocleana
Endemic flora of Panama
Endangered plants
Taxonomy articles created by Polbot